Lyropupa rhabdota is a species of air-breathing land snail, terrestrial pulmonate gastropod mollusks in the family Pupillidae. This species is endemic to Hawaii.

References

Lyropupa
Gastropods described in 1920
Molluscs of Hawaii
Taxonomy articles created by Polbot